Kill, I Oughtta  is the debut extended play of American heavy metal band Mudvayne. It was self-released by the band in 1997. In 2001, the EP was reissued by Epic Records under the title The Beginning of All Things to End. The reissue featured, as additional tracks, remixes of "Dig", the rare unreleased track "Fear", and "L.D. 50", a 17-minute sound collage which originally appeared as interludes on that album. It is the only release by Mudvayne to have any participation from original bassist Shawn Barclay.

Music and lyrics
According to Matthew McDonough, the EP was "thrown together" for the band's fans. It consists of five studio tracks originally intended for a demo, and three live tracks. No studio versions exist for the three live tracks "I.D.I.O.T.", "Central Disposal" and "Coal". The sound of Kill, I Oughtta is different from that of later Mudvayne albums. AllMusic reviewer Bradley Torreano wrote that "The songs are reminiscent of '90s alternative metal groups like Mind Funk and Paw".

Reception

Torreano gave the EP a favorable review, writing that it was "as good as L.D. 50, if not better". The Beginning of All Things to End was selected as an "album pick" by the website. In The Essential Rock Discography, Martin Charles Strong gave the EP six out of ten stars.

Legacy 

Kill, I Oughtta was issued by Epic Records under the title The Beginning of All Things to End on November 20, 2001, which features three bonus tracks, including remixes of "Dig", and "L.D. 50", a 17-minute sound collage  which originally appeared as interludes on the album of the same name. The Beginning of All Things to End was repackaged with L.D. 50 in a budget priced reissue on August 30, 2011. These albums, plus The End of All Things to Come, were repackaged as part of the budget priced reissue series "Original Album Classics" in 2012.

Track listing

Personnel
 Chad Gray – vocals
 Greg Tribbett – guitars
 Matthew McDonough – drums
 Shawn Barclay – bass (tracks 1–3, 5 and 7)
 Ryan Martinie – bass (tracks 4, 6 and 8–11)

Chart positions
Album

Singles

References

1997 debut EPs
Mudvayne albums
Alternative metal EPs
Self-released EPs